Leyla Aliyeva (born 3 July 1984) is the first daughter of the President of Azerbaijan, Ilham Aliyev.

Early life
According to her personal website, Aliyeva was born in Moscow on 3 July 1985. From 2006 to 2008, Aliyeva pursued a master's degree at the Moscow State Institute of International Relations (MGIMO-MSIIR; also the alma mater of her father).

Career

She is a member of the ruling Aliyev family in Azerbaijan. She has been embroiled in scandals involving the family's wealth, as she and her family members had wealth stashed in elaborate networks of offshore companies. The documents showed that Leyla and her sister Arzu controlled two previously hidden British Virgin Islands-incorporated firms — Kingsview Developments Limited and Exaltation Limited. Documents have also shown her to be the owner of offshore companies LaBelleza Holdings Limited and Harvard Management Limited.

Aliyeva is Vice-President of the Heydar Aliyev Foundation, a charity run by the Aliyev ruling family in Azerbaijan. Leyla and her sister own a number of banks in Azerbaijan. She is editor-in-chief of the style magazine Baku, launched in 2011.
Aliyeva has been involved in efforts to promote Azerbaĳan in Russia.  In 2011 Leyla Aliyeva launched the international campaign International Dialogue for Environmental Action. In July 2011, the Taraggi (Progress) Medal was conferred on Aliyeva for her contributions to the development of Azerbaijan–Russia relations.  In 2012, Aliyeva was awarded the medal “For Merits Before the Astrakhan Oblast". In 2013, she was decorated with Order of St. Olga 3rd Grade of the Russian Orthodox Church, and was awarded the “For Services to Volgograd Region” Prize. In 2015, Aliyeva was awarded the Pushkin Medal of the Russian Federation. During that year, she was conferred the title of Goodwill Ambassador of the UN Food and Agriculture Organization. In 2016, Leyla Aliyeva received a diploma of Honorary Professor at Moscow State University. and a "Medal of Merit" from Moscow State International Relations Institute's Scientific Council.

She was the executive producer of the 2016 film Ali and Nino, based on the novel of the same name by an Azerbaijani writer.

Personal life
Aliyeva is the mother of three children: Ali, Mikail and Amina.

In 2010 The Washington Post reported that Leyla along with her sister Arzu and brother Heydar own real estate in Dubai that is worth about $75 million. However, her husband at the time, Emin Agalarov, is the son of Russian billionaire Aras Agalarov. It is stated that those properties were bought by her father-in-law.

In May 2015 Aliyeva announced through Instagram that she had divorced Agalarov.

References

External links

1984 births
Living people
Azerbaijani journalists
Azerbaijani women journalists
Recipients of the Tereggi Medal
Daughters of national leaders
People named in the Panama Papers
Leyla Aliyeva
Agalarov family